Mamadou Sangare (born 26 June 2002) is a Malian professional footballer who plays as a midfielder for Austrian club TSV Hartberg, on loan from Red Bull Salzburg.

Club career
For the 2022–23 season, Sangare was loaned to Zulte Waregem in Belgium. On 6 February 2023, Sangare moved on a new loan to TSV Hartberg.

Career statistics

Club

References

2002 births
Living people
Malian people
Malian footballers
Association football midfielders
FC Red Bull Salzburg players
FC Liefering players
Grazer AK players
S.V. Zulte Waregem players
TSV Hartberg players
2. Liga (Austria) players
Belgian Pro League players
Malian expatriate footballers
Expatriate footballers in Austria
Malian expatriate sportspeople in Austria
Expatriate footballers in Belgium
Malian expatriate sportspeople in Belgium